Cherry pie is a pie baked with a cherry filling. Traditionally, cherry pie is made with sour cherries rather than sweet cherries. Morello cherries are one of the most common kinds of cherry used, but other varieties such as the black cherry may also be used.

Cherry pie is associated with Europe and North America and is mentioned in the lyrics of American folk songs such as "Billy Boy". Due to the cherry harvest in midsummer coinciding with Canada Day on July 1 and America's Independence Day on July 4, cherry pie is often served on these holidays. It is also associated with the celebration of Washington's Birthday because of the legend of young Washington's honesty regarding the felling of a cherry tree.

Cherry pie is often served and eaten with whipped cream or ice cream. A common preparation tradition in the United States is to decorate the crust with ornate pastry patterns. 

In the United States,  requires that frozen cherry pies contain at least 25% cherries, of which no more than 15% have blemishes. Artificial sweeteners are not permitted. In April 2019, the FDA proposed eliminating these standards.

See also
Can She Bake a Cherry Pie?
 Donauwelle
 List of cherry dishes
 List of pies, tarts and flans
 Pie in American cuisine

References

External links
 

American pies
British pies
German pies
Fruit pies
Sour cherries
pie
Thanksgiving food
Christmas food